William Comyn may refer to:
William Cumin, or Comyn, medieval bishop of Durham elect, and Lord Chancellor of Scotland
William Comyn, Lord of Badenoch (1163–1233)
William Comyns Beaumont (1873–1956), British journalist, author and lecturer
William Leslie Comyn (1877–?), Californian businessman and shipbuilder
William Comyn, Lord of Kilbride (died 1283), sheriff of Ayr in 1263

See also
William Cumin (disambiguation)